, who goes by the mononymous stage name Keiko (stylized all caps) is a Japanese pop singer. She is one of the vocalists of the FictionJunction project started by Yuki Kajiura, and was a core member of the vocal group Kalafina which ran for ten years from 2008 to 2018.

Biography
Keiko is from Shibuya, Tokyo, Japan. Prior to FictionJunction and Kalafina, she was in a rock vocal duo called Itokubo.

In 2007, she and FictionJunction member Wakana joined Kajiura's vocal project Kalafina, releasing the song "Oblivious". During her ten years there, Kalafina released five studio albums and two compilation albums, all of which have charted in the Oricon top 10. Space Craft describes her singing as a "captivating bass voice". Following the resignation of Kajiura from Space Craft, Keiko soon left the group in April 2018. She also rejoined FictionJunction for Kajiura's concert performance of tracks from the Princess Principal anime television series.

In April 2020, she announced she was working on a solo album with Avex Trax.  Her first solo single, which has the songs "Inochi no Hana" and "Be Yourself", was released in May. "Inochi no Hana" was her first song where she wrote lyrics. In September, she held a live performance titled KEIKO First Live K001 – I'm home. Her studio album Lantana was released on December 2. Her solo concert KEIKO Live K002 ** Lantana * Saita yo  to promote the album is scheduled for December 16 at Zepp Tokyo and includes a livestreaming of the event. Lantana reached No. 32 on the Oricon Albums Chart.

Discography

Singles

As lead artist

As a collaborating artist

Studio albums

Video albums

Other appearances

Notes

References

External links 

  at  Avex trax 
 Keiko profile at Space Craft 
 Keiko at Oricon 

1985 births
Living people
Japanese women pop singers